The Automated Enforcement System (AES) is the road safety enforcement system to monitor all federal roads, highways and expressways in Malaysia. This system came into operation on 22 September 2012.

Type
 Speed light camera
 Camera at accident area/Dangerous corner
 Red light camera to determine limited speed

Locations

Speed cameras
Km 7 Jalan Maharajalela (Federal Route 58), Teluk Intan
Km 376 North–South Expressway Northern Route (E1), Slim River
Km 91 Jalan Ipoh—Butterworth (Federal Route 1)
Km 81 Jalan Ipoh—Kuala Lumpur (Federal Route 1)
Km 204.4 North–South Expressway Northern Route (E1), Taiping North
Km 7.7 Kuala Lumpur–Seremban Expressway (E37), Sungai Besi, Kuala Lumpur
Along Persiaran Timur, Putrajaya
Km 301.9 North–South Expressway Southern Route (E2), Kajang
Along Lebuh Sentosa, Putrajaya
Km 6.6 South Klang Valley Expressway (Phase 1, E26)
km 151 north bound near pagoh

Accident areas or dangerous corners
Km 26 Jalan Ipoh—Kuala Kangsar (Federal Route 1) (Sungai Siput)

Red light cameras
Jalan Pasir Putih, Ipoh near TNB
Along Jalan Klang Lama, Kuala Lumpur
Along Jalan Ipoh, Kuala Lumpur
Taman Aman 3, Lahad Datu, Sabah

See also

Malaysian Expressway System
Malaysian Federal Roads System
Road signs in Malaysia
Integrated Transport Information System (ITIS)

2012 establishments in Malaysia
Transport in Malaysia